The U.S. Standard Atmosphere is a static atmospheric model of how the pressure, temperature, density, and viscosity of the Earth's atmosphere change over a wide range of altitudes or elevations. The model, based on an existing international standard, was first published in 1958 by the U.S. Committee on Extension to the Standard Atmosphere, and was updated in 1962, 1966, and 1976. It is largely consistent in methodology with the International Standard Atmosphere, differing mainly in the assumed temperature distribution at higher altitudes.

Methodology

The USSA mathematical model divides the atmosphere into layers with an assumed linear distribution of absolute temperature T against geopotential altitude h. The other two values (pressure P and density ρ) are computed by simultaneously solving the equations resulting from:
 , and
 the ideal gas law in molar form, which relates pressure, density, and temperature:
 
at each geopotential altitude, where g is the standard acceleration of gravity, and Rspecific is the specific gas constant for dry air.

Air density must be calculated in order to solve for the pressure, and is used in calculating dynamic pressure for moving vehicles. Dynamic viscosity is an empirical function of temperature, and kinematic viscosity is calculated by dividing dynamic viscosity by the density.

Thus the standard consists of a tabulation of values at various altitudes, plus some formulas by which those values were derived.

1962 version
The basic assumptions made for the 1962 version were:

air is a clean, dry, perfect gas mixture (c/c = 1.40)
molecular weight to 90 km of 28.9644 (C-12 scale)
principal sea-level constituents are assumed to be (in mole percent):
 N2 – 78.084%
 O2 – 20.9476%
 Ar – 0.934%
 CO2 – 0.0314%
 Ne – 0.001818%
 He – 0.000524%
 CH4 – 0.0002%.
assigned mean conditions at sea level are as follows :
P = 14.696 psi = 2116.22 psf = 101325 Pa = 29.92 inHg = 0.1013250 MN/m2
T = 59 °F = 518.67 °R = 15 °C = 288.15 K
ρ = 0.0764734 lb/(cu ft) = 1.225 0 kg/m3
g = 32.174 1 ft/s2 = 9.80665 m/s2
R* = 1545.31 ft⋅lb/(lbmol⋅°R) = 8.31432 J/(mol⋅K).

1976 version

This is the most recent version and differs from previous versions only above 51 km:

See also
Atmospheric models
NRLMSISE-00
Barometric formula

References

Documents
 U.S. Extension to the ICAO Standard Atmosphere, U.S. Government Printing Office, Washington, D.C., 1958.
 U.S. Standard Atmosphere, 1962, U.S. Government Printing Office, Washington, D.C., 1962.
 U.S. Standard Atmosphere Supplements, 1966, U.S. Government Printing Office, Washington, D.C., 1966.
 U.S. Standard Atmosphere, 1976, U.S. Government Printing Office, Washington, D.C., 1976 (Linked file is 17 MB).

External links

NASA GSFC ModelWeb
A mathematical model of the 1976 U.S. Standard Atmosphere
Online 1976 US Standard Atmosphere calculator and table generator
Calculate 28 properties of 1976 Standard Atmosphere

Atmosphere of Earth
Atmospheric thermodynamics